This article is about the particular significance of the year 1810 to Wales and its people.

Incumbents
Lord Lieutenant of Anglesey – Henry Paget 
Lord Lieutenant of Brecknockshire and Monmouthshire – Henry Somerset, 6th Duke of Beaufort
Lord Lieutenant of Caernarvonshire – Thomas Bulkeley, 7th Viscount Bulkeley
Lord Lieutenant of Cardiganshire – Thomas Johnes
Lord Lieutenant of Carmarthenshire – George Rice, 3rd Baron Dynevor 
Lord Lieutenant of Denbighshire – Sir Watkin Williams-Wynn, 5th Baronet    
Lord Lieutenant of Flintshire – Robert Grosvenor, 1st Marquess of Westminster 
Lord Lieutenant of Glamorgan – John Stuart, 1st Marquess of Bute 
Lord Lieutenant of Merionethshire - Sir Watkin Williams-Wynn, 5th Baronet
Lord Lieutenant of Montgomeryshire – Edward Clive, 1st Earl of Powis
Lord Lieutenant of Pembrokeshire – Richard Philipps, 1st Baron Milford
Lord Lieutenant of Radnorshire – George Rodney, 3rd Baron Rodney

Bishop of Bangor – Henry Majendie 
Bishop of Llandaff – Richard Watson
Bishop of St Asaph – William Cleaver 
Bishop of St Davids – Thomas Burgess

Events
January - Novelist Thomas Love Peacock first visits Maentwrog where he will settle for a time.
3 March - Launch of the Carmarthen Journal, the oldest surviving newspaper in Wales.
14 April - James Cotton, precentor of Bangor Cathedral, marries Mary Anne, daughter of Henry Majendie, Bishop of Bangor.
27 September - Thomas Picton serves with distinction under Wellington at the Battle of Bussaco.
24 October - The foundation stone of the Moel Famau Jubilee Tower is laid.
date unknown
Walter Coffin takes a mining lease on land at Dinas Rhondda. 
Hafod Copperworks opens in the Lower Swansea valley.
Etcher Charles Norris settles in Tenby.
Jonesville, North Carolina, is founded as Martinsborough; the name is later changed in honour of Hardy Jones (1747–1819).

Arts and literature

New books
The Beauties of England and Wales, vol. XI
Corff y Gainc (anthology)
Dafydd Ddu Eryri - Corph y Gaingc
Richard Fenton - Historical Tour through Pembrokeshire
Ann Hatton - Cambrian Pictures

Births
3 January - John Orlando Parry, actor, musician and songwriter (d. 1879)
12 January - John Dillwyn Llewelyn, botanist and pioneer photographer (d. 1882)
15 January - John Evan Thomas, sculptor (died 1873)
19 January - John Jones (Talhaiarn), poet and architect (died 1869)
24 January - Thomas Jones, Methodist missionary (died 1849)
4 August - Dan Jones, Mormon missionary (died 1862 in Utah)
date unknown - Thomas Jones, librarian (died 1875)

Deaths
10 March - George Morgan, American merchant of Welsh parentage, 67
April - Isaac Davis, advisor to the Hawaiian royal family
3 April - Thomas Edwards (Twm o'r Nant), poet and dramatist, 71
27 June - Richard Crawshay, industrialist, 70
12 August - David Jones, Church of England priest who was supportive of Welsh Calvinistic Methodism, 74
27 September - John Williams, barrister, 53

References

 Wales